The 1996–97 George Mason Patriots Men's basketball team represented George Mason University during the 1996–97 NCAA Division I men's basketball season. This was the 31st season for the program, the fourth and final under head coach Paul Westhead. The Patriots played their home games at the Patriot Center in Fairfax, Virginia.

Honors and awards 

Colonial Athletic Association All-Conference Team
 Nate Langley

Colonial Athletic Association All-Rookie Team
 Ahmad Dorsett

Colonial Athletic Association All-Defensive Team
 Nate Langley

Player statistics

Schedule and results

|-
!colspan=12 style=| Non-conference regular season

|-
!colspan=12 style=|CAA regular season

|-
!colspan=12 style=|1997 CAA tournament

References

George Mason Patriots men's basketball seasons
George Mason
George Mason men's basketball
George Mason men's basketball